Judy Ann Santos is a Filipino actress who began her career performing as a child on film and television. Her first screen appearance was in a supporting role in the drama series Kaming Mga Ulila (1986) and she made her film debut with a minor role in Sana Mahalin Mo Rin Ako (1988), appearing alongside Nora Aunor and Tirso Cruz III. At age ten, Santos had her first leading role as the eponymous character in the children's television series Ula, Ang Batang Gubat (1988). She achieved wider recognition when she and Gladys Reyes played the titular roles in the drama series Mara Clara (1992). The show, which aired until 1997, became one of the longest running Filipino television series. It established her as a star and earned Santos a FAMAS Award for her performance in the 1996 film adaptation.

Following this breakthrough, Santos went on to play several lead roles on primetime television, including the soap opera Esperanza (1997), and the anthology series Judy Ann Drama Special (1999). She then played a woman born out of wedlock yearning for her father's acceptance in the drama series Sa Puso Ko Iingatan Ka (2001), an NBI agent in the police procedural series Basta't Kasama Kita (2003), and the title character in the superhero series Krystala (2005). For the last of these, she received a Star Award for Best Actress. Santos's film roles have also garnered praise from critics. As a woman with dissociative identity disorder in the psychological drama Sabel (2004), she won a Gawad Urian and Golden Screen Award for Best Actress. In 2006, Santos starred opposite Ryan Agoncillo as his feisty and outspoken wife in Jose Javier Reyess comedy Kasal, Kasali, Kasalo, her biggest critical and commercial success to date. Santos was awarded with the FAMAS, Golden Screen, Luna, Metro Manila Film Festival, and Star Award for Best Actress. The following year, she reprised her role in the sequel Sakal, Sakali, Saklolo (2007).

Santos starred in several high-profile directors' projects, including Joel Lamangan's period drama Aishite Imasu 1941: Mahal Kita (2004), Topel Lees supernatural horror Ouija (2007), and Jun Lanas psychological horror thriller  Mag-ingat Ka Sa... Kulam (2008). The 2010 medical drama series Habang May Buhay reunited her with Reyes of Mara Clara, and won her a KBP Golden Dove Award for Best Actress. She then served as a presenter in the Philippine editions of the reality television competition shows Junior MasterChef (2011), MasterChef  (2012), and Bet on Your Baby (2013). Santos went on to play an abused wife seeking revenge in the domestic drama series Huwag Ka Lang Mawawala (2013) and the antihero in the drama series Starla (2019).

Alongside her screen work, Santos co-produced the independent film Ploning (2008). She also starred in the Brillante Mendoza–directed war drama Mindanao (2019). Both films were submissions for Best International Feature Film at the  81st and 93rd Academy Awards, respectively. For the latter, she garnered Best Actress wins at the 41st Cairo International Film Festival and the 45th Metro Manila Film Festival.

Film

Television

See also
 List of awards and nominations received by Judy Ann Santos

References

External links
 

Actress filmographies
Philippine filmographies